Enosi Neon (former name APEN) Agiou Athanasiou is a professional handball team based in Limassol, Cyprus. It used to play for the Cypriot First Division.

Players 

 Ioannou Lenos
 Stefanos Stefanou

References

External links
https://web.archive.org/web/20130523133126/http://agiosathanasios-handball.com/

Cypriot handball clubs
Sport in Limassol